Thubten Zopa Rinpoche (born Dawa Chötar) is a Tibetan Buddhist lama in the Gelug school. He is known for founding the Foundation for the Preservation of the Mahayana Tradition and the Maitripa College in Portland, Oregon.

Biography
Thubten Zopa Rinpoche, also called Lama Zopa Rinpoche has an extensive biography of him in the book The Lawudo Lama by Jamyang Wangmo.

Lama Zopa Rinpoche was born in Thangme, Nepal, in 1945. Early in life, he was recognized as the reincarnation of the Lawudo Lama Kunzang Yeshe, from the same region (hence the title "Rinpoche"). At the age of ten, Lama Zopa Rinpoche went to Tibet and studied and meditated at Domo Geshe Rinpoche’s monastery near Pagri. He took his monastic vows at Dungkar Monastery in Tibet.

Lama Zopa Rinpoche left Tibet in 1959 for Bhutan after the Chinese occupation of Tibet. Lama Zopa Rinpoche then went to the Tibetan refugee camp at Buxa Duar, West Bengal, India, where he met Lama Yeshe, who became his closest teacher. The Lamas met their first Western student, Zina Rachevsky, in 1967 then traveled with her to Nepal in 1968 where they began teaching more Westerners.

Lama Zopa met Choekyi Gyaltsen, 10th Panchen Lama, in Nepal in 1986 and in Tibet. 

Lama Zopa is most noteworthy as the co-founder, with Lama Thubten Yeshe, of Kopan Monastery and the Foundation for the Preservation of the Mahayana Tradition (FPMT). In 1972 he along with Lama Yeshe founded Tushita Meditation Centre near McLeod Ganj at village Dharamkot in Himachal Pradesh. Since the 1984 death of Lama Yeshe, Lama Zopa has served as the FPMT's spiritual director. FPMT is involved with a number of charitable activities including "under Rinpoche’s guidance. These include initiatives such as: offering food to ordained Sangha; providing scholarships to study Buddhist philosophy; offering to the main teachers of the Lama Tsongkhapa tradition and sponsoring annual debates; offering grants for social services such as to old age homes, schools, hospitals and monastic institutions; providing comprehensive Dharma programs; translating Dharma texts; sponsoring holy objects: statues, stupas and prayer wheels, and saving animals. 

Lama Zopa Rinpoches's books are published by Wisdom Publications and Lama Yeshe Wisdom Archive. Free transcripts of some of his teachings are available from the Lama Yeshe Wisdom Archive. 

Lama Zopa Rinpoche offers spiritual advice on a range of topics to students, many of which are available on the FPMT and LYWA websites.

Lineage 
Lama Zopa Rinpoche is a Gelugpa lineage holder, having received teachings from many of the great Gelugpa masters. His Root Guru is HH Trijang Lobsang Yeshe Tenzin Gyatso since he was a young boy studying in Buxa, India. Lama Zopa Rinpoche is a devoted student of the 14th Dalai Lama and has outlined that offering service to the Dalai Lama as much as possible and to be able to fulfill his wishes is the highest priority for the FPMT organization.

Published books 
Lama Zopa Rinpoche has a number of books published by Wisdom Publications and Lama Yeshe Wisdom Archive including the following titles:
 How To Enjoy Death: Preparing to Meet Life’s Final Challenge without Fear
 The Four Noble Truths: A Guide to Everyday Life
 Bodhichitta: Practice for a Meaningful Life
 Dear Lama Zopa: Radical Solutions for Transforming Problems into Happiness
 Ultimate Healing
 The Door to Satisfaction
 Transforming Problems Into Happiness
 The Heart of the Path Book: Seeing the Guru as Buddha
 Teachings From the Medicine Buddha Retreat Book
 Sun of Devotion, Stream of Blessings Book
How Things Exist: Teachings on Emptiness

See also
Thubten Yeshe
Geshe Lhundrup Rigsel
Foundation for the Preservation of the Mahayana Tradition

References

External links
 Lama Zopa Rinpoche's biography
 Information on Lama Zopa Rinpoche on the FPMT website
 Many of Rinpoche's books and online teachings at LYWA
 Teachings and Advice of Lama Zopa Rinpoche at LYWA
 Books by Lama Zopa Rinpoche published by Wisdom Publications
 
 Lama Zopa Rinpoche Video Teachings on Youtube

1946 births
Living people
Lamas
Tulkus
Tibetan Buddhists from Nepal
Rinpoches
Tibetan Buddhist spiritual teachers
Gelug Lamas
Foundation for the Preservation of the Mahayana Tradition
20th-century lamas
People from Solukhumbu District
Date of birth missing (living people)